This is a list of the members of the 9th Riigikogu, following the 1999 election.

Election results

Lists

By party

Estonian Centre Party (28)

Pro Patria Union (18)

Estonian Reform Party (18)

Moderates (17)

Estonian Coalition Party (7)

Estonian Country People's Union (7)

Estonian United People's Party (6)

By votes

References

9th